Colorado Ranger is a 1950 American Western film starring James Ellison and directed by Thomas Carr.

Plot

Cast
James Ellison
Russell Hayden
Raymond Hatton

References

External links
Colorado Ranger at IMDb
Colorado Ranger at TCMDB

1950 films
American Western (genre) films
1950 Western (genre) films
Lippert Pictures films
Films directed by Thomas Carr
American black-and-white films
1950s English-language films
1950s American films